Andrzej Jurkiewicz (29 May 1907 – 2 August 1967) was a Polish painter. His work was part of the painting event in the art competition at the 1948 Summer Olympics.

References

1907 births
1967 deaths
20th-century Polish painters
20th-century Polish male artists
Olympic competitors in art competitions
People from Tlumach
Polish male painters